The Powers of Criminal Courts (Sentencing) Act 2000 (c.6) is a consolidation Act of the Parliament of the United Kingdom that brings together parts of several other Acts dealing with the sentencing treatment of offenders and defaulters. It was drafted by the Law Commission and the Scottish Law Commission.

With amendments, it consolidated sentencing legislation previously spread across twelve separate Acts. Much of the Act has been repealed by the Criminal Justice Act 2003, which introduced significant changes to sentencing from 2005.

References 

United Kingdom Acts of Parliament 2000
Criminal law of the United Kingdom
Courts of the United Kingdom
Sentencing (law)